Copeland Islands Marine Provincial Park is a provincial park in British Columbia, Canada, located in Desolation Sound to the northwest of Lund on the northern Sunshine Coast off the west coast of the Malaspina Peninsula.

The park was established in 1971, comprising approximately 423 hectares, 153 of which is upload, 278 hectares of foreshore.

References

Provincial Parks of the Gulf Islands
Provincial parks of British Columbia
Sunshine Coast (British Columbia)
1971 establishments in British Columbia
Protected areas established in 1971
Marine parks of Canada